Burial is the first album by the Norwegian Christian metal band Extol. It was released on Endtime Productions and then Solid State Records the following year. According to Allmusic, Burial was "a breath of fresh air among a genre that relies on satanic gimmicks", and marked a renewal in the Christian metal scene. In 2010, HM magazine ranked it #13 on the Top 100 Christian metal albums of all-time list.

Recording 
Burial was recorded at Børud Lydskredderi, Norway, mastered at The Mastering Room, and released on 22 December 1998. Burial was the first release by the Swedish record label Endtime Productions.

Critics and fans usually categorize the album's style as either death/black metal or simply metal because it contains elements of several subgenres of heavy metal music. The notable black metal elements on the album include the high-pitched shrieking vocals of Peter Espevoll, some black metal tremolo riffs, such as on "Innbydelse", and the slightly raw sound production. However, the album's overall atmosphere is not particularly dark or cold; on several songs the soundscape contains happy sounding elements such as the cheerful power metal vocals of the guitarist Ole Børud, creating tensions between the darker elements.

The musical output of Burial is a combination of power metal, old school death metal and traditional heavy metal, and the latter style is especially apparent on the main riff of "Renhetens Elv". Additionally, the songs contain interludes that include elements of industrial music, such as on the song "Justified", jazz and classical music, such as on the song "Tears of Bitterness". The guest musician Maria Riddervold played violin on the songs "Embraced" and "Tears of Bitterness". The musicianship on Burial is virtuosic, taking the style a step towards technical death metal and progressive death metal, technically exceptionally precise, and contains experimental, bizarre song structures. One critic wrote that the album's style "varies from extremely aggressive discharges to beautiful guitar harmonies, while the main focus relies on twisted riffs and ferocious directions." "Renhetens Elv" and "Innbydelse" are written in Norwegian, and the rest are in English.

Many critics and fans regard the last song, "Jesus Kom Til Jorden For Å Dø", as the highlight of the album. "Jesus Kom Til Jorden For Å Dø" (Norwegian for "Jesus came to world to die") is a song arranged by Arnold Børud, and it is a hymn-like, doom metal-esque and folkish piece. Arnold Børud also played the organs on the song.

Reception 

During the time Burial was released, Extol was described as Norway's second best band by the Norwegian magazine Scream. The album was considered a breath of fresh air in the death metal genre that had run stale for years. It received good reviews from the secular metal press.

Track listing 
All songs written by Extol
 "Into Another Dimension" (Instrumental) - 1:28
 "Celestial Completion" - 6:14
 "Burial" - 4:49
 "Renhetens Elv" - 6:21
 "Superior" - 5:08
 "Reflections of a Broken Soul" - 7:28
 "Justified" - 5:22
 "Embraced" - 3:41
 "Innbydelse" - 4:58
 "Tears of Bitterness" - 7:27
 "Work of Art" - 5:19
 "Jesus Kom Til Jorden For Å Dø" - 3:47
 "The Prodigal Son" - 6:05*

(*)This song was only released on the Japanese Version as a bonus track. It also appeared on Mesmerized EP.

Personnel 
Extol
 Peter Espevoll - vocals
 Ole Børud - guitar, vocals
 Christer Espevoll - guitar
 Eystein Holm - bass guitar
 David Husvik - drums

Additional musicians
 Arnold Børud - keyboards
 Maria Riddervold - violins on "Embraced" and "Tears of Bitterness"

Production 
 Producers - Extol

References 

1998 albums
Extol albums
Unblack metal albums
Solid State Records albums